Tarlan Parvaneh (born July 9, 1998) is an Iranian actress. She has received various accolades, including nominations for a Hafez Award and an Urban International Film Festival Award. She won a Children and Youth International Film Festival Award for her performance in Octopus 1: White Forehead (2011).

Career
Tarlan Parvaneh made her cinematic debut in 2005 with the movie ‘Left-Handed’ and has since appeared in more than 60 cinematic and television projects.

She demonstrated her talent with her performance in the children’s movie ‘Octopus’ (2011).

Among the movies in which she has performed are ‘Half Mine, Half Yours’ (2006), ‘The Wrong Wife’ (2006), ‘Octopus’ (2011), ‘The Married Life of Mr. Mahmoudi and His Spouse’ (2012), ‘Can You Hear Me Mom?’ (2005) ‘Night Shift’ (2014) and ‘The Runaway’ (2016).

Some of the series in which she has appeared are ‘The Grand Prize’ (2004), ‘Under the Blade’ (2006), ‘Hereafter’ (2010) and ‘Ancient Land’ (2013).

Filmography

Film

Web

References

External links

1998 births
Iranian actresses
People from Shiraz
Living people